A  ((), "possessor of morality", from Pali sīla) is a female renunciant in Burmese Buddhism; a Burmese Theravada Buddhist nun. They are not fully ordained nuns (bhikkhunis), as the full ordination is not legal for women in Burma, but are closer to sāmaṇerīs, 'novice nuns'. According to 2016 statistics published by the State Sangha Maha Nayaka Committee, there were 60,390  in Myanmar (Burma).

Precepts
Like the maechi of neighbouring Thailand and the dasa sil mata of Sri Lanka,  occupy a position somewhere between that of an eight-precept lay follower and a fully ordained monastic.

 observe the ten precepts and can be recognized by their pink robes, shaven head, orange or brown shawl and metal alms bowl.  would also go out on alms round on uposatha days and receive uncooked rice or money.

These are attached to the Buddhist name given.

 often reside in either separate quarters or in segregated kyaung (temple-monasteries). They do not have to look after the monks, but may help cook if required. Although ranked lower than the monks, they are not subservient to them, but form their own communities.

Ordination

 are not fully ordained members of the Sangha. The full  lineage of Theravada Buddhism died out, being preserved only in the Mahayana tradition, and for various technical and social reasons was therefore absent, leaving the lay practice of living as a  the only option for women who wish to renounce in Burma. As a result, in many respects the lifestyle of  resembles that of an ordained , even to the extent of making a daily alms-round.

A new Theravada  sangha was first convened in 1996, and since then many more have taken the full vows.

See also 

 Anagārika
 Dasa sil mata
 Donchee
 Maechi
 Siladhara Order
 Upāsaka and Upāsikā

References

External links 

Burmese Buddhist titles
Ordination of women in Buddhism
Buddhist religious occupations
Buddhist monasticism